Deh Chenashk (also Romanized as Deh Chenāshk; also known as Chenāshak) is a village in Kuhsarat Rural District, in the Central District of Minudasht County, Golestan Province, Iran. At the 2006 census, its population was 648, in 176 families.

References 

Populated places in Minudasht County